Stance may refer to:

Sports 
Stance (American football), the position an American football player adopts when a play begins
Stance (martial arts), the distribution, foot orientation and body positions adopted when attacking, defending, advancing or retreating
Stances (tae kwon do),  several stances used for different activities
Horse stance, a posture in Asian martial arts
Karate stances, body positions used to create power, flexibility and movement
Wushu stances, a fundamental part of all Chinese martial arts
Stance (yoga), also known as a posture or asana,  a body position

Music 
Stance (EP), a 1978 record by R. Stevie Moore
Stance Punks, a Japanese punk rock band, formed in 1999

Other uses
Stance (brand), an American sock and underwear brand
Stance (journal), an academic journal of philosophy
Stance (vehicle), a characteristic of a motor vehicle
Stance (Vranje), a village in the municipality of Vranje, Serbia
Stance (linguistics), linguistic expression of judgement or philosophical position
Emanuel Stance (1843-1887), a Buffalo Soldier in the United States Army
Life stance, a person's relation with what they accept as being of ultimate importance
A philosophical position in a logical argument
Various human positions, especially standing positions